Ernest Alfred Harvey was an English professional footballer who played as a right back in the Football League for Glossop.

Career statistics

References 

English footballers
English Football League players
Southern Football League players
1883 births
Year of death missing
Footballers from Chesterfield
Association football fullbacks
Gillingham F.C. players
Glossop North End A.F.C. players
Hyde United F.C. players